Xavier Daniel Hochstrasser (July 1, 1988 in Onex, Switzerland), is a Swiss footballer who currently plays for FC Onex as a defensive midfielder or a winger. He is known for his superb crossing and ability to set up goals, and specializes in corner kicks.

Career

Early years
Xavier enjoyed a productive and ultimately successful development into a senior player with BSC Young Boys, playing with the youth teams of his hometown club FC Onex and then later Etoile Carouge. Between 2005 and 2006, he also spent one year on the books of Swiss giants Servette, scoring 31 goals in 68 games whilst playing as a winger for their reserve team but failing to make the grade as a senior with the club.

BSC Young Boys
Xavier's form with Servette's B-team attracted the attentions of BSC Young Boys, who upon learning of Servette's plans to release him at the end of the 2005/2006 Super League season signed the teenager on a free transfer in June 2006. He made an instant impact, scoring a fine goal during only his fourth league appearance and finishing his début season with 1 goal from 17 Super League appearances, playing predominantly as right winger, and an impressive tally of eleven assists. He would go on the better this in the 2009/2010 Super League season, when in just 34 matches he set up an incredible 15 goals for his teammates (the most assists by a single player in Europe that season) and also scored four himself in what still remains his most productive season to date.

International career
He has 8 caps and 2 goals for the Switzerland national under-21 football team, earning his first cap in 2007 and completing his transition to the senior level Switzerland national football team in October 2009, when he was called up to the squad that would be expected to take part in the exhibition games leading up to and the qualifying matches for the 2010 FIFA World Cup. He was not used by coach Ottmar Hitzfeld for any of these games however, and failed to make the squad that took part in the tournament in South Africa in summer 2010.
He represented Switzerland at the 2012 Summer Olympics.

References

1988 births
Living people
Swiss men's footballers
Swiss expatriate footballers
Swiss expatriate sportspeople in Italy
Switzerland under-21 international footballers
Association football midfielders
BSC Young Boys players
Servette FC players
Étoile Carouge FC players
Calcio Padova players
FC Luzern players
FC Lausanne-Sport players
Expatriate footballers in Italy
Swiss Super League players
Serie B players
Footballers at the 2012 Summer Olympics
Olympic footballers of Switzerland